Kimberlin Ann Brown Pelzer (born June 29, 1961) is an American television actress, best known for her role as Sheila Carter in the CBS daytime soap operas The Young and the Restless and The Bold and the Beautiful from 1990.

Career
Brown began her career as a model, jetting to Paris, Tokyo and Milan. Later she returned to Los Angeles and made her television debut in an episode of ABC series Fantasy Island. Brown later appeared in films Back to School (1986), Eye of the Tiger (1986), Who's That Girl (1987) and 18 Again! (1988), and well as made her soap opera debut in Capitol  in 1987. Later she played Candace Durrell/Danielle Steele in Santa Barbara.

In 1990, Brown began starring in the CBS soap opera The Young and the Restless (after originally auditioning for the role of Cassandra Rawlins) and moved to The Bold and the Beautiful in 1992 playing Sheila on both soaps. While she left The Bold and the Beautiful in 1998, she continues to make special guest appearances. In 1993 and 1995, she won Soap Opera Digest Award for Outstanding Villainess in a Drama Series – Daytime and in 1993 received Daytime Emmy Award for Outstanding Supporting Actress in a Drama Series nomination. 

Brown portrayed Rachel Locke, mother of Livvie Locke (Kelly Monaco) on the ABC soap opera Port Charles from 1999 to 2001. In late 2004, Brown debuted in the recurring role of Dr. Paige Miller on the ABC soap opera One Life to Live. She exited the soap in 2005 when the soap could not match the salary The Young and the Restless was offering in order for her to stay. She was replaced by Cady Huffman and Alexandra Neil. In 2005, Brown returned to the role of Sheila on The Young and the Restless after a long absence from the show. In early 2006, she was released from her contract on The Young and the Restless, though her character was still mentioned, from time to time. When her character returned to The Young and the Restless later that year, however, she was not played by Brown.

Brown had been asked to return to The Young and the Restless early in 2010 for a storyline that was subsequently dropped. She took on a short-term role as a judge on All My Children in October 2010. In 2011, Brown appeared in Gregori J. Martin's web-series The Bay.  She portrays Dr. Grace Drum, a psychiatrist.  Brown first appeared in a summer special "Far From The Bay", and continued on in the series' second season.
Brown returned to the role of Sheila on B&B from 2017–2018 and again in August 2021.

Brown and her husband, Gary Pelzer, are small-business owners; they own and run an avocado farm in California.

Politics 
Brown is a Republican. In 2016, Brown was a speaker at the 2016 Republican National Convention on the night Donald Trump was officially nominated as the party's candidate for President of the United States. After her speech, Brown got extremely emotional to Fox Business Network over what her vocal support for Donald Trump and his policies might do to her career and the treatment she had received since it was announced she would be a speaker at the convention.

In October 2017, Brown formally announced her candidacy as a Republican for California's 36th congressional district, challenging Democrat Raul Ruiz in the November 2018 election. She lost the election, receiving 40.98% of the vote to Ruiz's 59.2%.

Personal life
Brown was born in Hayward, California, and raised in San Diego.  She has been married to Gary Pelzer since May 1991. They have two children, Alexes Marie and Nicholas.

Filmography

Film

Television

References

External links

The Young and the Restless: Joshua Morrow and Kimberlin Brown at Mammoth Mountain Invitational! – The Young and the Restless News – Soaps.com
 ]

1961 births
20th-century American actresses
21st-century American actresses
Actresses from California
American actor-politicians
American film actresses
American soap opera actresses
American television actresses
California Republicans
Living people
People from Hayward, California
People from San Diego
Candidates in the 2018 United States elections